The 1984–85 Rugby League Premiership was the 11th end of season Rugby League Premiership competition.

The winners were St Helens.

First round

Semi-finals

Final

References

1985 in English rugby league